England Roller Hockey, which originated in England, is a game played on roller-skates with a ball and stick.  It was first played at The Lava Rink in Denmark Hill, London in 1885.  The National Rink Hockey Association of England (NRHA) is the roller hockey governing body in England.

History and development
Roller hockey, originally called "rink hockey," was established in 1896, making it one of the oldest sports recognised associations. It consisted of 10 men on each side, and the first roller hockey games were played with a tennis ball and ordinary walking sticks, or sometimes even old umbrella handles.

During the infancy of the game, the sport built up very rapidly, with many teams starting in the London area.  New associations were created for the southern and the northern parts of the country.  Whilst roller hockey is still a minority sport throughout the world, it has been developed by many European countries into a well-paid, professional sport.  In England, though, after its promising start, roller hockey has declined.  Its number of registered players increase in line with the skating trend.

Aside from the professional coaching director, Carlos Amaral, the association is entirely amateur.  The England roller hockey team has been a FIRS World Championship winner twice (in 1936 and 1939, when the championships were also contested as the European Championships) and CERH European Championship winner 12 times. The national teams take part in U17, U20, Men's and Women's competitions both in Europe and at the World Roller Games, organised by World Skate.

The major competition in English roller hockey is the NRHA Premier League, which has seen both Southsea RHC and Herne Bay United dominate in previous decades. The secondary tournament in England is the National Cup (seniors), in which Herne Bay RHC holds the record for most wins.

The NRHA is divided into three regions: Northern Counties (NCRHA), Eastern Counties (ECRHA) and South Eastern Counties (SECRHA).

England Roller Hockey and the NRHA

England Roller Hockey is the national association for roller hockey across the country.  It is registered as The National Roller Hockey Association of England (NRHA).

In Britain, roller hockey forms one of seven roller sport disciplines affiliated with the British Roller Sports Federation (BRSF), which is recognised as the national governing body (NGB) of all the disciplines.  The sport of roller hockey was governed by the Fédération Internationale de Roller Sports (FIRS) through its affiliate, the Comité Internationale de Rink-Hockey (CIRH), which is recognised by the International Olympic Committee (IOC). Following the Extraordinary Congress resolution in September 2017 in Nanjing (China), the FIRS has changed its denomination to World Skate, the first step towards a managerial set up attentive to the needs of its base.

The day-to-day operations of the NRHA are conducted by its executive committee members, with their sub-committees, which are elected every four years at the Annual General Meeting of the Association (AGM).  The committee consists of the president, general secretary, treasurer, competitors, officials, and marketing.

In addition, the presidents (or their authorised representatives) of each affiliated region of the NRHA also sit on the association's executive committee.

Although roller hockey is an English creation, it is most popular in Latin countries such as Spain, Portugal, Italy and Argentina, where it is played professionally by clubs including as FC Barcelona, FC Porto and SL Benfica.

The Regions

Northern Counties

The Northern Counties Roller Hockey Association is the regional body within the National Roller Hockey Association of England, which covers the northern counties of England, including Greater Manchester, Yorkshire and Lincolnshire.  Notable clubs include Middlesbrough RHC, Manchester RHC and Grimsby RHC.  While there have been many clubs in Northern England since the NRHA began in 1896, it now features just 7 clubs, including Plymouth.

Until recently Northern Counties representatives had great success in men's senior roller hockey with Middlesbrough and Grimsby winning the Premier League and National Cup in recent seasons.

List of clubs 
Grimsby RHC, Manchester RSC, Middlesbrough, Plymouth RHC, Sheffield Wildcats RH & RSC, Spectrum Spartans RHC and Spen Valley RHC.

Eastern Counties

The Eastern Counties Roller Hockey Association, historically the least successful, is currently the most decorated affiliation to the NRHA.  It has the most clubs and members out of the three regions, and covers counties including Norfolk, Suffolk, Cambridgeshire and Hertfordshire.  Its most famous clubs include King's Lynn who have won the Premier League four seasons in a row and Letchworth.

List of clubs 
Cambridge & Cottenham RHC, Colchester RHC, Ely & Chesterton United RHC, King's Lynn RHC, Letchworth RHC, Norwich City RHC, Peterborough RHC, Skaters RHC, and Soham RHC.

South Eastern Counties

The South Eastern Counties is the most prolific region, conceding 29 out of 44 Premier League titles and 70 of the 85 National Cup titles.  Herne Bay RHC dominated English roller hockey for much of its early existence, competing at the legendary Pier Pavilion, which was demolished in 2011.  Their success was followed mostly by Hampshire club, Southsea RHC, and later Herne Bay United, which dominated the Premier League championships up until 2010.

Other notable South Eastern Counties clubs include Maidstone RHC and the newly formed London RHC.

List of clubs 
Farnham RHC, Herne Bay RHC, Herne Bay United RH&SC, RHC Invicta, London RHC, Maidstone RHC.

World championships

In the early World Championships, England was successful in winning the first two tournaments:

However, following World War II, England had no success in the World Championships, apart from a second-placed finish in the 1948 games in Montreux, Switzerland.

In the modern game, the World Championships are split into two categories.  The World "A" Championships contest is contested by the best teams in the world, while the World "B' Championships, contested every other year to the World A's, see the top three finishers qualify to compete in the World A's the following year in a relegation/promotion system.  England usually fights to remain in the World A's, or is relegated and fights for promotion.  The national team has finished not higher than 13th in the World A's in many years, although they have been regular contenders in the World A's.

In the 2011 FIRS Men's Roller Hockey World Cup in San Juan, Argentina, England finished in 15th place and competed in the 2012 FIRS Men's B-Roller Hockey World Cup in Canelones, Uruguay. Since 2017, English teams (Men's /Women's/U20 Men's) have represented their country in the World Championships at the World Roller Games organised by World Skate

European championships

England had great success in the early tournaments of the European championships, winning 12 titles.  However, after World War II, although England attained one second-placed finish in 1948 and two fourth-placed finishes in 1957 and 1959, they have struggled to make any real international impact for many years on the European stage, which has been predominantly dominated by Spain, Portugal and Italy.

National Teams
The National teams represent England at the following levels in the European competitions organised by World Skate - Europe. The Men's team, the Women's team and the Under 19 Men's also compete at the World Championships held at the World Roller Games organised by World Skate.
 Senior Men's
 Senior Women's
 Under 19 Men's
 Under 17 Men's
 Under 17 Ladies

Premier League

History of Winners

No. of Championships by Team

2019–2020 season

View the Premier League 2019–20 Season here.

The clubs that are competing in the Premier League 2019 - 2020 Season are: Ely and Chesterton United, Grimsby, Herne Bay, King's Lynn, London, Manchester, Middlesbrough, Peterborough and Soham.
The top tier of English rink hockey is the Premier League consisting of 9 teams playing single match home/away format hockey.

The second tier of English rink hockey is National Division 1. It is played on a tournament basis where teams play twice a tournament, with a total of 10 games in the season. In 2018-19 ECU won the right to move up to the National Premier League, with Herne Bay also making the move up. The clubs that are competing in the National Division 1  2019 - 2020 Season are: Cambridge and Cottenham RHC, Ely & Chesterton Inited RHC, Farnham RHC, Letchworth RHC, RHC Invicta and  Spen Valley Flyers RHC.

National Cup

History of Winners

Number of English Cups by Team

References

External links
 National Roller Hockey Association of England (NRHA)
World Skate Europe - all competitions

1896 establishments in England
Roller hockey in England
Roller